Vizela River is a river in Portugal. It flows into Ave River and it is named after the city of Vizela.

Rivers of Portugal
Tributaries of the Ave River